Innisdale Secondary School is a public secondary school that is located in the south end of Barrie, Ontario, Canada. It is the largest high school in Simcoe County. It was founded in 1978. The principal is Brian MacIsaac.

History

Innisdale was founded in 1978. Between 1878 and 1945, the land was home to a farmstead. The maple trees that line the street that is attached to the school's parking lot were planted by the original owners of the farm and have not changed (except for some removals due to safety concerns) since the school was built. In honor of the original owners of the farm, the Kennedy family, the street beside which the trees run was named Kennedy Way in 2005.

Sports and activities
Sports offered include: badminton, baseball, basketball, cross country running, curling, flag football, football, golf, hockey, mountain biking, basketball, rugby, skiing (alpine and Nordic), soccer, swimming, tennis, track and field, Capoeira dance arts, ultimate frisbee, and volleyball. Academic related extracurriculars offered include: debate club, DECA, STEM club, chess club, and book club. Artistic extracurriculars offered include: dance team, yearbook, stage band, improv club and culinary club

Innisdale also has a co-operative education program for athletes training with the Mariposa School of Skating.

Feeder schools
Innisdale receives students from a large catchment area of south Barrie (Allandale), downtown Barrie and a portion of northern Innisfil.
Feeder schools include:
Algonquin Ridge ES
Allandale Heights PS
Assikinack PS
Hewitt's Creek PS
Hillcrest PS
Hyde Park PS
Mapleview Heights ES
Portage View PS
Sunnybrae PS
Warnica PS
Willow Landing ES

See also
List of high schools in Ontario

References

External links
 Official website

High schools in Barrie
Educational institutions established in 1978
1978 establishments in Ontario